Cathaica fasciola is a species of air-breathing land snail, a terrestrial pulmonate gastropod mollusk in the family Camaenidae.

Taxonomy
This species was described under the name Helix fasciola by French naturalist Jacques Philippe Raymond Draparnaud in 1801.

Subspecies
 Cathaica fasciola fasciola (Draparnaud, 1801)
 Cathaica fasciola pyrrhozona (Philippi, 1845). It was described as Helix pyrrhozona.

Helix pyrrhozona is the type species of the genus Cathaica.

Distribution
This species is widely distributed in China.

It is also known from Pliocene of Xifeng Red Clay (4.5 Ma - 3.4 Ma) in the Chinese Loess Plateau. Other localities include Lower Pliocene Red Clay of Shueh-hwa-shan in Hebei Province; Pleistocene Red clay of Fenho, Shanxi Province; near Honanfu in Henan Province; near Tung-ho and in Tsing-ling-shan in Shaanxi Province; near Ta-ho in Gansu Province.

Draparnaud listed "France: La Rochelle" as the type locality. This error could happen if Draparnaud did not know origin of imported shells.

Description
The shell is thin, but solid. The color of the shell is white, rather opaque, with a broad chestnut-brown band at the periphery, 
and a faint brownish band below the suture. The shape of the shell is depressed above and below. The spire is low-conoid. The surface is shining, sculptured above with close rib-striae, becoming more delicate below. The shell has 5½ whorls. The earliest whorl is smooth, shining, forming a subacute apex. Following whorls are slightly convex, slowly increasing, separated by an impressed suture. The last whorl is much wider, rounded at the periphery, hardly descending in front. Aperture is slightly oblique, lunate-oval. Peristome is white and thickened with a strong white lip. The umbilicus is rapidly narrowing to a narrow, deep perforation. The width of umbilicus is one-eighth the greatest diameter.

The width of the shell is 15 mm. The height of the shell is 8.5 mm.

Digestive system: radula and jaw was depicted by George Washington Tryon and Henry Augustus Pilsbry in 1894.

Reproductive system: penis is slender, ending in a long retractor and the terminal vas deferens. Dart sac is large, opening into atrium. There is a dense cluster of about ten club-shaped, glandular mucus glands near the atrium base. Spermatheca duct is long.

The diploid number of chromosomes (2n) is 60. Seven chromose pairs are metacentric, one pair is submetacentric and 22 pairs are telocentric.

Ecology
Cathaica fasciola it is often locally abundant. It was thought that Cathaica fasciola belongs to the cold-aridiphilous and meso-xerophilous groups of species in 2006. However it is considered as a typical species of eurytopic group as of 2018. It is one of main species found in Quaternary loess terrestrial gastropod assemblages in China.

Cathaica fasciola is polyphagous and it causes damage to vegetables, fruits, flowers and other economic agricultural crops. The food preference study of Cathaica fasciola was published in 2015.

It hibernates in winter and it aestivates in summer. It produces an epiphragm during the dormancy.

Parasites of Cathaica fasciola include Dicrocoelium trematode.

Predators of snails Cathaica fasciola include Rathouisia leonina (in laboratory conditions only).

Cathaica fasciola is considered as a pest in agriculture. Most affected areas in China include: Beijing municipality, Zhejiang Province, Henan Province, Yunnan Province and Shanxi Province.

References
This article incorporates public domain text from references

External links

  Zhang, M., Zong, Y., Wang, X., Cai, X., & Zhang, Z. (2009). Study on the death-feigning behavior of the harmful mollusk, Cathaica fasciola (Draparnaud 1801). Scientia Agricultura Sinica, 42(11), 3914-3921. abstract, abstract in Chinese.
  Minzhao, Z., Yu, Z., Xueying, W., Xue, C., & Zhiyong, Z. (2009). The Study on the Body-Turning Behavior of Cathaica fasciola (Draparnaud)[J]. Chinese Agricultural Science Bulletin, 17, 199-202. abstract, abstract in Chinese.
 
  Zhang, J.M., Yu, G.Y. & Zhou, W.C. (2011). The identification and control of Cathaica fasciola. Plant Protection 37: 208–209. .

Camaenidae
Gastropods described in 1801